The 1945 Tennessee A&I Tigers football team represented Tennessee Agricultural & Industrial State College as a member of the Midwest Athletic Association (MAA) during the 1945 college football season. In their second season under head coach Henry Kean, the Tigers compiled a 9–2 record (3–0 against conference opponents), won the MAA championship, defeated Texas College in the Vulcan Bowl, and outscored opponents by a total of 335 to 69. The team played its home games at Tennessee State Stadium and Sulphur Dell in Nashville, Tennessee.

Schedule

References

Tennessee AandI
Tennessee State Tigers football seasons
Tennessee AandI Tigers football